Theodora is a 1921 Italian silent film dramatization of the life of the Byzantine empress Theodora.

Plot
Theodora, a Roman courtesan and former slave girl, marries the Byzantine emperor Justinian and assumes the throne as Empress of Rome. However, a love affair with a handsome Greek leads to revolution and armed conflict in both Byzantium and Rome.

Cast

Rita Jolivet as Teodora Augusta
Ferruccio Biancini as Justinian
René Maupré as Andreas
Emilia Rosini as Antonina
Adolfo Trouché as Belisarius
Mariano Bottino as Marcellus
Guido Marciano as Boia principale
Marie Belfiore as Tamyris
Giovanni Motta	as Buzes
Leo Sorinello as Mara
G. Rosetti as Amru
Luigi Rinaldi as Calcante
Alfredo as Philo
Alfredo Bertoncelli as Euphrata
Giuliano Gardini as Cospiratore
François Renard as Cospiratore
Pietro Ferrari	as Cospiratore
Alberto Belfiore as Cospiratore

Production
To aid the directorial staff, miniatures of all the sets to be constructed were made, allowing the staff to work out the grouping of the thousands of extras and the camera angles and lighting for the scenes.

See also
List of historical drama films
Late Antiquity

References

External links

1921 films
1920s Italian-language films
Italian films based on plays
Films based on works by Victorien Sardou
Films set in the 6th century
Films set in the Byzantine Empire
1921 drama films
Italian silent feature films
Biographical films about Roman emperors
Cultural depictions of Justinian I
Cultural depictions of Theodora I
Italian black-and-white films